Frank Sands Brian (May 1, 1923 – May 14, 2017) was an American professional basketball player.

Life and career 
A 6’1" guard from Louisiana State University, Brian signed with the Anderson Packers of the National Basketball League in 1947. In 1949 the NBL and BAA merged to form the NBA. He scored 2,442 points in three seasons with the Packers, then joined the Chicago Stags of the NBA when the Packers franchise folded following the 1949–1950 season.  The Stags quickly traded Brian to the Tri-Cities Blackhawks, whom Brian represented as an NBA All-Star in 1951.

Brian also earned All-NBA Second Teams honors in 1951 after averaging 16.8 points, 3.9 assists and 3.6 rebounds. Frank Led Tri-Cities Blackhawks (now "Atlanta Hawks") in scoring in 1951.Frank was 5th in the League with his 1,144 points for the Blackhawks during 1951–1952 season. In May 1951, the Blackhawks traded Brian to the Fort Wayne Pistons for Howie Schultz and Dick Mehen. Frank led Ft. Wayne Pistons (now "Detroit Pistons") in scoring in 1952 & 1953, ranking 6th in the league with 1,051 points during the 1951–52 season.  Brian had five productive seasons with the Pistons, who went to the NBA Championships in 1955 and 1956, and he retired in 1956 with 6,663 combined NBL/NBA career points.
 Basketball All-American at LSU and 2-time All-Southeast Conference.
 National All-AAU Basketball Team.
 National Basketball League All-Rookie (1947)
 2-Time NBL All-Star (1948,1949)
 Nicknamed "Flash" for being one of the League's fastest players.
 NBA Basketball Pioneer...played in first 7 seasons of NBA history (1949–1956)
 Played in first two NBA All-Star games (1951,1952)
 All-NBA (1950,1951)
 Led Tri-Cities Blackhawks (now "Atlanta Hawks") in scoring in 1951.
 Was 5th in the League with his 1,144 points for the Blackhawks during 1951–1952 season.
 Ranked 6th in the league with 1,051 points during the 1951–52 season with the Fort Wayne Pistons.
 Led Ft. Wayne Pistons (now "Detroit Pistons") in scoring in 1952 & 1953.
 Ranked in Top-6 in NBA in scoring for 3 consecutive seasons (1950,1951,1952)
 Led NBA in Games Played in 1952 (66)
 2nd Best Free Throw Percentage in NBA in 1955 (85.1%)
 Played in 1955 and 1956 NBA Championships.
 Played in first NBA Championship Series of the Shot Clock Era (1955)
 Scored 6,663 points in 10-year professional career.
 Inducted into the Louisiana Sports Hall of Fame in 1986.
 Inducted into the LSU Hall of Fame on September 13, 2013.
Brian died on May 14, 2017 in Zachary, Louisiana, aged 94.

NBA career statistics

Regular season

Playoffs

References

External links
 Jimmy Smith, "Playing in the first NBA All-Star Game an unforgettable memory for 90-year-old Frank Brian of Zachary", nola.com, Feb. 11, 2014

1923 births
2017 deaths
American men's basketball players
Anderson Packers players
Basketball players from Baton Rouge, Louisiana
Fort Wayne Pistons players
LSU Tigers basketball players
LSU Tigers track and field athletes
National Basketball Association All-Stars
People from Zachary, Louisiana
Point guards
Shooting guards
Tri-Cities Blackhawks players
Sportspeople from East Baton Rouge Parish, Louisiana